So Long Letty is a 1920 silent American comedy film directed by Al Christie and starring Grace Darmond, T. Roy Barnes, and Colleen Moore. It was an adaptation of a 1916 popular stage comedy musical of the same name that starred Charlotte Greenwood.

Plot
Harry Miller (Barnes) is a party boy who loves the cabaret scene and nights on the town while his wife Grace is a homebody, distressed by her husband's errant ways. Their neighbors are the opposite. Tommy Robbins (Walter Hiers) likes domestic life and home cooking while his wife Letty (Darmond) is devoted to the wild life. Harry and Tommy hatch a plan to solve their problems; that they divorce their wives and swap. The wives overhear the plan and go along with the suggestion, though following a plan of their own. They suggest a week-long trial period of platonic marriage, during which the wives do all they can to make their new potential mates miserable. In the end the husbands are happy with the wives who they have married.

Cast
 T. Roy Barnes as Harry Miller
 Colleen Moore as Grace Miller
 Walter Hiers as Tommy Robbins
 Grace Darmond as Letty Robbins

Production
The Christie Film Company purchased the rights to the play So Long Letty from Oliver Morosco for $40,000.

Remake
The film was remade by Warner Bros. in 1929 under the same title. The 1929 version stars Charlotte Greenwood in the titular role. Greenwood was the star of the original 1916 Broadway play.

References

Bibliography
 Codori, Jeff (2012), Colleen Moore; A Biography of the Silent Film Star, McFarland Publishing, Print , EBook .

External links

 
 
 
 

1920 films
1920 comedy films
1920s English-language films
Silent American comedy films
American silent feature films
American black-and-white films
American films based on plays
Films directed by Al Christie
Film Booking Offices of America films
1920s American films